Camilla Dalby (born 15 May 1988) is a former Danish team handball player who plays for the club Randers HK and for the Danish women's national handball team.

At the 2010 European Women's Handball Championship she reached the bronze final and placed fourth with the Danish team.
On 10 May, she won her first Champions League trophy with ŽRK Budućnost.

Personal life
In October 2017, she announced that she is expecting her first child. She is due in April 2018, meaning she will not play the remainder of the season for Randers HK.

Achievements 
Champions League:
Winner: 2015
Finalist: 2014

References

External links
 Profile on Randers HK official website

1988 births
Living people
Danish female handball players
Handball players at the 2012 Summer Olympics
Olympic handball players of Denmark
People from Randers
Sportspeople from the Central Denmark Region